Death rock (or deathrock) is a rock music subgenre incorporating horror elements and gothic theatrics. It emerged from punk rock on the West Coast of the United States in the early 1980s and overlaps with the gothic rock and horror punk genres. Notable death rock acts include Christian Death, Kommunity FK, 45 Grave, and Super Heroines.

Characteristics

Death rock songs usually incorporate a driving, repetitive rhythm section; the drums and bass guitar laying the foundation within a  time signature while the guitars either play simple chords or effects-driven leads to create atmosphere. Lyrics can vary, but are typically introspective and surreal, and deal with the dark themes of isolation, gloom, disillusionment, loss, life, death, etc.; as can the style, varying from harsh and dark to upbeat, melodic, and tongue-in-cheek. Death rock lyrics and other musical stylistic elements often incorporate the themes of campy horror and sci-fi films. Despite the similar-sounding name, death rock has no connection to death metal, which is a subgenre of heavy metal.

Etymology
The term "death rock" was first used in the 1950s to describe a thematically related genre of rock and roll, which began in 1958 with Jody Reynolds' "Endless Sleep" and ended in 1964 with J. Frank Wilson's "Last Kiss". The term was also applied to the Shangri-Las' "Leader of the Pack". These songs about dead teenagers were noted for their morbid yet romantic view of death, spoken word bridges, and sound effects. In 1974, the term "death rock" was used by Gene Grier to describe the same phenomenon in rock music.

The term later re-emerged to describe the sound of various West Coast punk bands. It most likely came from one of three sources: Rozz Williams, the founding member of Christian Death, to describe the sound of his band; the music press, reusing the 1950s term to describe an emerging subgenre of punk; and/or Nick Zedd's 1979 film They Eat Scum, which featured a fictitious cannibalistic "death rock" punk band called "Suzy Putrid and the Mental Deficients."

History

Predecessors
The earliest influences for some death rock acts can be traced to the horror-themed novelty rock and roll acts of the late 1950s and early 1960s such as Bobby “Boris” Pickett and the Crypt-Kickers and Zacherle with "Monster Mash"; Screamin' Jay Hawkins with "I Put a Spell on You"; Screaming Lord Sutch & the Savages with "Murder in the Graveyard"; and Don Hinson and the Rigormorticians with "Riboflavin-Flavored Non-Carbonated Poly-Unsaturated Blood". Contemporarily, the 1979 single "Bela Lugosi's Dead" by British post-punk group Bauhaus was one of the major influences amongst the early death rock scene. Other influences included the Doors, David Bowie, Alice Cooper, the Cramps, Black Sabbath and the Damned.

The Los Angeles punk rock scene began in the mid to late 1970s, with groups like the Runaways, the Weirdos and the Germs. Within this scene The Gun Club's merger of grim take on heavily blues indebted punk was a notable Los Angeles precursor. The Flesh Eaters too took a macabre take on early LA punk, by merging the sound with lyrics influenced by Edgar Allan Poe, the Beat Generation and Catholicism. Furthermore, T.S.O.L. were a defining group in the scene who briefly embraced gothic and deathrock elements.

Origins

At the beginning of the 1980s an offshoot of those interested in darker horror themes emerged from the Los Angeles punk rock scene. According to a 2006 article by Stylus Magazine one popular theory as to the reason for this split was the 1980 suicide of Germs vocalist Darby Crash. According to this interpretation, Crash's death led to a period of mourning amongst many of those in the scene and eventually to a fascination with the macabre. Nonetheless, amongst this splinter group band began to form merging the sound of Los Angeles punk rock with these darker elements to create death rock. The most prominent of these groups were Christian Death, 45 Grave, Super Heroines and Kommunity FK. The bands generally performed and congregated at the Anti-Club, a club night in Hollywood that would change venues every few weeks. Outside of this scene, Theatre of Ice from Fallon, Nevada independently created a sound which some sources have considered as pioneering death rock.

Interaction
Before death rock was emerging as a distinctively darker subgenre of punk rock in the United States, other subgenres of punk and post-punk were developing independently in the UK.

By 1980, a wave of post-punk bands such as Joy Division, Siouxsie and the Banshees, Bauhaus, and The Cure abandoned the intensity of punk music in favor of a more elaborate style characterized by moody guitars and dark droning bass guitar patterns combined with romantic and morbid themes. This style of rock became known as "gothic rock" or "positive punk". A second wave of bands had coalesced a few years later, headed by acts such as Sex Gang Children and Southern Death Cult, along with Brigandage, Blood and Roses, and Ritual. Many of those bands featured tribal drumming, high-pitched vocals, scratchy guitar, and bass guitar as melodic lead instrument and a visual look blending glam with Native American-influenced warpaint and spiky haircuts. 

During 1982, the scene was brewing at the London gothic rock club Batcave. Initially envisioned as a venue specializing in glam rock and new wave musical acts, the two main bands which debuted and performed frequently at the Batcave, Specimen and Alien Sex Fiend, developed their own different sounds strongly influenced by horror in British pop culture, which set them apart from the rest of the glam and post-punk scenes in Britain. In 1983, Gun Club toured in Europe as did Christian Death in 1984, leading to cross-pollination between the European gothic rock scene and the American death rock scene. By 1984,  California death rock band Kommunity FK toured with UK gothic rock band Sex Gang Children (and the following year with Alien Sex Fiend) which continued the trend in which American and British movements intermixed.

Influenced more by the British scene and less by California, death rock bands began to form in other parts of the United States, such as Samhain (1983) in Lodi, New Jersey; Holy Cow (1984) in Boston, Massachusetts (and later Providence, Rhode Island); Gargoyle Sox (1985) in Detroit, Michigan; and Shadow of Fear (1985) in Cleveland, Ohio. The fertile New York scene featured Scarecrow (1983), Of a Mesh (1983), Chop Shop (1984), Fahrenheit 451 (1984), The Naked and the Dead (1985), Brain Eaters (1986), the Children's Zoo (1986), the Plague (1987) and the Ochrana (1987).

Irreconcilable differences
The mid-1980s marked the second wave of gothic rock, when the sound began to shift away from its punk and post-punk roots and towards the more serious, rock-oriented approach. Bauhaus broke up, Williams left Christian Death, and the Sisters of Mercy became the dominant and most influential gothic act. The term "gothic rock" became preferred over "death rock" (previously, they had been used interchangeably), a change which Williams attributed to the influence of the Sisters of Mercy. As a result, the term "death rock" was seldom used except in retrospective reference to the Los Angeles bands 45 Grave and Christian Death.

The mid-1990s marked a third wave of gothic rock, as the music drifted its furthest from the original punk and post-punk sound by incorporating many elements of the industrial music scene at the time (which itself had moved away from experimental noise and into a more dance-rock oriented sound) and the more repetitive and electronic sounds of EBM. Some clubs even completely dropped death rock and first generation gothic rock from their setlists to appeal to a crossover crowd.

Revival
Halloween 1998 saw the launch of Release the Bats, a monthly goth and death rock club night in Long Beach, California. During its run time it became southern California's most frequented goth night and Long Beach's longest running club night, launching the careers of death rock bands like Mephisto Walz. The success of the club caused many other death rock club nights to be established in the following years. This, along with the rise of online music piracy led to the increased popularity of older death rock bands and establishment of new, international death rock groups, like Bloody Dead And Sexy, commencing the first death rock revival. During this period groups like the Phantom Limbs and Black Ice began to merge death rock with elements of no wave and synthpunk. Many groups from this period, most notably Tragic Black, began to make use of an aesthetic heavily inspired by Batcave fashion.

Artists and bands
Only Theatre of Pain, Christian Death's 1982 debut album, is cited as the first American gothic album and cannot be easily classified as either a darker flavor of punk, horror punk or gothic rock. As a result, Williams, the band's deceased lead singer (also known for Shadow Project and Premature Ejaculation), was considered one of the most influential artists in the goth and death rock scene. Other influential male death rockers included Patrick Mata of Kommunity FK and Larry Rainwater of Ex-VoTo.

Dinah Cancer has been referred to as the "Queen of Deathrock", the "Goddess of Deathrock" and the "High Priestess of Deathrock" for her role as the frontwoman for 45 Grave during a time when female lead singers were still considered somewhat of a rarity. Other influential female death rockers included Eva O and Voodoo Church's Tina Winter.

Many artists in the United States released EPs and LPs prior to 1982 which would now be considered death rock, such as Theatre of Ice and Mighty Sphincter. British bands also made major contributions to the death rock sound by adding a strong post-punk influence, including Joy Division, Bauhaus and Siouxsie and the Banshees. Other bands from around the world added their own unique contribution to death rock, including Xmal Deutschland in Germany, Virgin Prunes from Ireland, and the Birthday Party in Australia.

References

External links
 "Deathrock: A Brief History, Part I" (Souciant magazine, 2012)
 "A Brief History of Deathrock, Part II" (Souciant magazine, 2012)

 
American rock music genres
American styles of music
Dark music genres
Gothic music genres
Goth subculture
Punk rock genres